Aleksandar Vulin (born 2 October 1972) is a Serbian politician and lawyer serving as the director of the Security Intelligence Agency (BIA) since 1 December 2022.  Additionally, he previously served as director of the Office for Kosovo and Metohija from 2012 to 2013, minister without portfolio in charge of Kosovo and Metohija from 2013 to 2014, minister of labour, employment, veteran and social policy from 2014 to 2017, minister of defence from 2017 to 2020, and as minister of internal affairs from 2020 to 2022 

Vulin is the founder and former president of the Movement of Socialists (PS), a left-wing nationalist political party. He headed the party from 2008 to 2022. Vulin was a deputy of Mirjana Marković, the wife of Slobodan Milošević, and served as a high-ranking member of far-left League of Communists – Movement for Yugoslavia (SK–PJ) and Yugoslav Left (JUL) parties, while in the 2000s, he was a member of the Socialist Party of Serbia (SPS) before forming PS.

Early years
He was born in Lozovik, to Bosnian Serb parents. He finished primary school in Novi Sad, Grammar's School in Sremski Karlovci and later graduated from the University of Kragujevac Faculty of Law. He stated that ever since his childhood "he has always been a communist". Vulin began his political career during the high school days in Novi Sad by supporting the anti-bureaucratic revolution led by Slobodan Milošević between 1986 and 1989.

Political career
During the collapse of the communist Yugoslavia in 1990, Vulin joined the League of Communists – Movement for Yugoslavia, the so-called "army party" led by general Stevan Mirković. Vulin became a general secretary. In 1994, he was one of the founders of the Yugoslav Left, a party led by Mirjana Marković, the wife of Slobodan Milošević. In the new party, Vulin became a leader of the Revolutionary Youth, the party's youth organisation. He left the Yugoslav Left when it joined with the Milošević's Socialist Party to the coalition with the Vojislav Šešelj's Serbian Radical Party in 1998.

Later he founded the Democratic Left, and then the Movement of Socialists in August 2008.

In 2012, following the 2012 Serbian parliamentary election after which Serbian Progressive Party-led coalition took power, which consisted of Vulin's Movement of Socialists, Vulin was named the director of newly established Office for Kosovo and Metohija. He stayed on the position until 2 September 2013 when he became the Minister without portfolio in charge of Kosovo and Metohija.

Following the 2014 Serbian parliamentary election, leader of the Serbian Progressive Party Aleksandar Vučić formed the government on 27 April 2014 with Vulin being named the Minister of Labour, Employment, Veteran and Social Policy. He kept the office after the 2016 Serbian parliamentary election, in the second cabinet of Aleksandar Vučić.

During his time in the office as Minister of Labour, Employment, Veteran and Social Policy, he was known for his often and fierce criticism directed towards Croatia, as well as occasional insulting of Croatian politicians and officials.

In June 2017, Aleksandar Vučić gave mandate to Ana Brnabić to form the governmental cabinet. On 29 June 2017, the cabinet of Ana Brnabić was formed, with Vulin swapping minister positions with Zoran Đorđević to become the Minister of Defence.

On April 21, 2018, Vulin was proclaimed persona non grata in the Republic of Croatia after saying: "only the Supreme Commander of the Serbian Army – Aleksandar Vučić – can decide about me entering in Croatia, not Croatian ministers."

In 2020, he was awarded Order of the Flag of Republika Srpska.

On 27 June 2020, Vulin tested positive for COVID-19. In June 2021, Vulin spoke positive of Serbian irredentist idea of Greater Serbia by saying: "Greater Serbia never happened, otherwise we [the Serbs] would know where we live and which ethnic spaces belong to us".

References

External links

1972 births
Living people
Politicians from Novi Sad
Serbian people of Bosnia and Herzegovina descent
Serbian people of Romani descent
League of Communists – Movement for Yugoslavia politicians
Yugoslav Left politicians
Movement of Socialists politicians
Government ministers of Serbia
Interior ministers of Serbia
University of Kragujevac alumni
Defence ministers of Serbia
Serbian nationalists